Hangar 18 is a 1980 American science fiction action film directed by James L. Conway and written by Ken Pettus, from a story by Thomas C. Chapman and Conway. It stars Darren McGavin, Robert Vaughn, Gary Collins, James Hampton and Pamela Bellwood.

Plot
Hangar 18 is about a cover-up following a UFO incident aboard the Space Shuttle. A satellite, just launched from the orbiter, collides with an unidentified object which, after being spotted on radar moving at great speeds, had positioned itself just over the shuttle. The collision kills an astronaut in the launch bay. The events are witnessed by Bancroft and Price, the astronauts aboard. After returning to Earth, they are stonewalled when they try to discuss what happened. Harry Forbes, Deputy Director of NASA, simply tells them that "everything is going to be all right".

After it makes a controlled landing in the Arizona desert, the damaged alien spacecraft is taken to Wolf Air Force Base in Texas and installed in Hangar 18, where scientists and other technicians, headed by Harry Forbes, can study it. Due to an impending presidential election, government officials are anxious to prevent any public knowledge of the event.

Meanwhile, unbeknownst to Forbes, the Air Force puts out a news story blaming Bancroft and Price for the death of their colleague and for the destruction of the satellite. The men know they can prove their innocence by viewing the telemetry tapes which recorded the UFO; but when they view them, all evidence of the object has been erased. Through a friend who works at a remote tracking station, they see the real telemetry and discover where the alien craft landed. They set out to expose the cover-up and clear their names.

In the hangar, investigators who enter the ship find its two crew members are dead. They determine that, during the collision with the satellite, chemicals were released in the craft that produced a short-lived toxic gas. They find a human woman in a stasis chamber, who later wakes up screaming. They realize that symbols on the control panels match those used by ancient Earth civilizations. Video on the ship's computer shows extensive surveillance of power plants, military bases, industrial plants and major cities worldwide. Autopsies performed on the aliens show that they and humans had similar evolutionary processes. A scientist deduces that the ship could not have reached Earth on its own, but must have been launched from a much larger, faster and more long-ranged mother ship.

In their pursuit of the truth, Bancroft and Price get closer to Hangar 18 but are targets of government agents. They elude one team, who are killed during a high-speed chase. Later, they find the brakes on their rental car have stopped working, and after careening along roads, they come to rest on the grounds of a gas refinery. Agents begin shooting at them, so they drive off in an oil tanker. With the agents in pursuit, Price climbs onto the tanker, lets some gas out of the truck, lights an emergency flare, and tosses it. Their pursuers crash and are killed, but Price is fatally shot. When Forbes learns of Price's death, he demands the Air Force take Bancroft to Hangar 18 or he will go to the press with the truth. Their cover-up and careers now threatened, government officials decide to remotely fly an explosives-filled plane into Hangar 18 to destroy all evidence of the event.

The researchers have determined that the aliens have been to Earth before and that human beings are, in fact, their descendants. Further examination of the video footage reveals that the industrial and military sites are "designated landing areas", suggesting the aliens are preparing to return.

When Bancroft arrives at the base, he crashes through the base's security gate and, hiding in a warehouse, is discovered by Forbes, who takes him to Hangar 18 and the alien craft. Just as a researcher reveals that a translation of the aliens' language indicates that they are about to return, the plane crashes into Hangar 18, creating a huge explosion.

The next day, a news report says that Bancroft, Forbes and their group of technicians survived the blast, shielded inside an alien spacecraft. Forbes schedules a press conference for that afternoon.

Cast
 Gary Collins as Steve Bancroft
 James Hampton as Lew Price
 Robert Vaughn as Gordon Cain
 Pamela Bellwood as Dr. Sarah Michaels
 Andrew Bloch as linguist Neal Kelso
 Philip Abbott as Lt. General Frank Morrison
 Joseph Campanella as Frank Lafferty
 Tom Hallick as Phil Cameron
 Steven Keats as Paul Bannister
 William Schallert as Professor Mills
 Darren McGavin as NASA Deputy Director Harry Forbes
 Cliff Osmond as Sheriff Duane Barlow
 Stuart Pankin as Sam Tate
 H. M. Wynant as Flight Director

Production
Parts of the movie were filmed in Midland and Big Spring, Texas, and at the former Pyote Air Force Base, as well as the former Webb Air Force Base. Filming also took place in Salt Lake City, Utah.

The title is believed to stem from hoaxer Robert Spencer Carr, who in 1974 named Hangar 18 as the storage location of bodies from the 1948 Aztec UFO hoax.

Reception

Critical response
When the film was released The New York Times film critic Vincent Canby dismissed the film, writing, "Hangar 18 is the sort of melodrama that pretends to be skeptical, but requires that everyone watching it be profoundly gullible ... It stars ... Robert Vaughn as the ruthless and fatally unimaginative White House Chief of Staff ... In the supporting cast is Debra MacFarlane, who plays a beautiful female specimen found aboard the saucer, a young woman who looks amazingly like a Hollywood starlet. But then, I guess, she is. The flying saucer itself looks like an oversized toy that might have been made in Taiwan."

Christopher John reviewed Hangar 18 in Ares Magazine #8 and commented that "Hanger 18 is the perfect Sunday evening movie for television. If you watch closely, you can even see the spaces they planned for the commercials."

Release
The film was released by Sunn Classic Pictures, an independent U.S.-based film distributor whose library is now owned by Paramount Pictures, notable for presenting what TV Guide called "awful big-screen 'documentaries' [like] In Search of Noah's Ark and In Search of Historic Jesus. Hangar 18 was released on Blu-ray on June 25, 2013.

Hangar 18 was released in US theaters in July 1980. The film was released in Ireland on March 13, 1981. Hangar 18 was one of the very few American films to be theatrically shown in the Soviet Union. It premiered on the TV channel 1 on the New Year night of 1982. Because of the general unavailability of films with elements of science fiction and the action genre, it achieved enormous popularity among Soviet youth.

In May 1989, Hangar 18 was featured in an episode of the movie-mocking television show Mystery Science Theater 3000 during the KTMA era.

A version with an alternate ending was televised as Invasion Force.  Leonard Maltin's 2015 Movie Guide says that the new ending undermines the whole film.

Hangar 18 was rated PG in New Zealand for low level violence.

Influence
Director James L. Conway later revisited the concept when he filmed the Star Trek: Deep Space Nine episode "Little Green Men".   In that episode, characters travel to 1947 Roswell where their ship is stored in Hangar 18.

References

Mystery Science Theater 3000

See also
 The Bamboo Saucer, a similar film from 1968

External links
 

1980 films
1980 action films
1980 independent films
1980 science fiction films
1980s English-language films
1980s science fiction action films
American independent films
American science fiction action films
American science fiction adventure films
Films about astronauts
Films directed by James L. Conway
Films shot in Salt Lake City
Films shot in Texas
Taft Entertainment Pictures films
1980s American films